Beimen may refer to the following:

 Beimen District, a district in Taiwan
 Beimen railway station, a station on the TRA West Coast Line
 Beimen metro station, a station in the Taipei MRT